Nepenthes krabiensis is a tropical pitcher plant native to southern Thailand, where it grows at 600–700 m above sea level. It is closely related to N. rosea.

The specific epithet krabiensis is derived from the name of Krabi Province, to which it is apparently endemic, and the Latin ending -ensis, meaning "from".

References

Carnivorous plants of Asia
krabiensis
Plants described in 2016